Brachiosaurus is a genus of sauropod dinosaur.

Brachiosaurus may also refer to:
9954 Brachiosaurus, an asteroid

See also
Branchiosaurus, a Palaeozoic amphibian